Azekah Daniel (Urdu: ازیکا ڈینئیل) is a Leading Pakistani actress. Daniel played a leading role of Noor Jehan in Noor Jehan (2015), Hooriya Malaal-e-Yaar (2018) and Sara in Tera Gham Aur Hum (2020). She is further known for her roles in Aao Laut Chalain (2016), Balaa (2018), Cheekh (2019).

Personal life 
Daniel is from Karachi, Pakistan. She belongs to a Christian family.  She received her early education from St. Michael's Convent School and later on she went for university degree in Karachi. She was also in cabin crew of PIA before acting. She lives with her family in Karachi. She has recently remained talk of the town, when she had talked about "Be humorous, not rude" after a terrible experience at a live show.

Filmography

Film

Television

References

External links

Living people
1992 births
21st-century Pakistani actresses
Actresses from Karachi
Pakistani film actresses
Pakistani television actresses
Pakistani Roman Catholics